Adama Diakité is a West African name, may refer to:

 Adama Diakité (footballer, born 1978), Malian footballer in 2002 African Cup of Nations
 Adama Diakité (footballer, born 1991), French footballer
 Adama Diakité (footballer, born 1993), Ivorian footballer in Italy